Saint Kuksha may refer to:

 Saint Kuksha of the Kiev Caves (died after 1114), monk and martyr from the Kiev Pechersk Lavra (Kiev Monastery of the Caves)
 Kuksha of Odessa (1875 - 1964), modern saint canonized by Ukrainian Orthodox Church